José "Pepe" González (1939 – 13 March 2009) was a Spanish comic book artist.

Career

Early career 
José González started his career at the age of 17 working on Rosas Blancas and Brigitte for the company Editorial Toray.  He joined the agency Selecciones Ilustradas in 1960 and drew romance comics for Fleetway.  González also worked as a pin-up artist during this time for the international market.

Vampirella 
Due to his connections with the Selecciones Ilustradas agency, González started working for Warren Publishing in 1971.  Jim Warren described his reaction to seeing González's art in The Warren Companion:

Starting with issue 12 in 1971, González became the primary artist for the character Vampirella.  Comics historian David Roach discusses the reaction to González's art on Vampirella in The Warren Companion:

González received immediate acclaim for his work on Vampirella, and his first story won the Warren Award for best art in a story in 1971.  González drew the Vampirella story for every issue from issue 12 through issue 34.  He won another Warren Award in 1974 for best art on a story for his work in issue 33.

By mid-1974, González's output for Vampirella reduced and multiple fill in artists including Jose Ortiz and Leopold Sanchez contributed Vampirella stories.  González would remain as the primary artist for Vampirella for the next few years, but by 1977 he shared duties with artist Gonzalo Mayo.  Warren would also reprint the three part series "Herma", which had appeared in 1974 in issues 8-10 of the magazine 1984. After issue 82 of Vampirella in 1979, González ceased drawing for Warren, except for one page pin-up contributions (which had started appearing with issue 39 in 1975) which were printed on the Contents page.  González would return to Warren in 1982 and would draw stories for Vampirella in the final 6 non-reprint issues of the title until Warren's bankruptcy.  From 1971 through 1983, González drew 58 stories for Warren Publishing, putting him in the top 10 most prolific artists at the company.  He drew 53 total strips of Vampirella, making him that title's most prolific artist.

Bibliography
Interior art includes:

Warren
Vampirella #12-34, 37-38, 42-44, 50, 53, 56-62, 65-68, 71-72, 74-76, 82,  106, 108, Annual 1972

Sources

External links
Jose González biography on Lambiek Comiclopedia

Documentary series "LOVE STRIP: 6 EPISODE DOCU-THRILLER ABOUT THE NIGHTS AND DAYS OF PEPE GONZÁLEZ": www.vampilovestrip.com/

1939 births
2009 deaths
Spanish comics artists
Artists from Barcelona